Richard Muckermann (28 November 1891 – 2 February 1981) was a German politician of the Christian Democratic Union (CDU) and former member of the German Bundestag.

Life 
In the first state elections in North Rhine-Westphalia in 1947, Muckermann won a mandate for the Center, which he continued to hold until the end of the legislative period on 17 June 1950, even after his move to the CDU. On behalf of the Christian Democrats, he entered the German Bundestag in the first federal elections in 1949 and was a member of parliament until 1961. He was always directly elected in the Neuss - Grevenbroich constituency.

Literature

References

1891 births
1981 deaths
Members of the Bundestag for North Rhine-Westphalia
Members of the Bundestag 1957–1961
Members of the Bundestag 1953–1957
Members of the Bundestag 1949–1953
Members of the Bundestag for the Christian Democratic Union of Germany
Members of the Landtag of North Rhine-Westphalia